The Black and Indian Mission Office is a Catholic organization in the United States comprising the Bureau of Catholic Indian Missions, the Commission for the Catholic Missions among the Colored People and the Indians and the Catholic Negro-American Mission Board, which are institutions for mission work that maintain separate functions but operate with one staff and one board of directors.

History
The Bureau and the Commission have shared common offices in Washington, D.C. since 1935 and were joined by the Catholic Negro-American Mission Board in 1980. In 2009, the three institutions adopted the Black and Indian Mission Office as a banner for their joint webpage. 

The Bureau of Catholic Indian Missions has supported and promoted Catholic missions among Native Americans and has defended the rights of Native Americans. It was founded as the Office of Catholic Commissioner for Indian Missions in 1874 with  approval by J. Roosevelt Bayley, the Archbishop of Baltimore.

Since 1887, the Commission for the Catholic Missions among the Colored People and the Indians has administered a national annual Lenten collection to support African American and Native American missions. In 1884, the Third Plenary Council of Baltimore decreed the establishment of the Lenten collection and a commission of three bishops to administer it. Since the 1980s, the Commission and its collection have been known respectively as the Black and Indian Mission Office and the Black and Indian Mission collection.

The Catholic Negro-American Mission Board has supported and promoted Catholic missions among African Americans. It was founded in 1907 as the Catholic Board for Mission Work among the Colored People to provide a second national funding stream for Black Catholic missions.

Archival collections
Marquette University Special Collections and University Archives serves as the archival repository for the three institutions of the Black and Indian Mission office.  Their archival records comprise one collection known as the Bureau of Catholic Indian Missions, which  generated the bulk of the records.

References

Attribution

External links
Black and Indian Mission office
Bureau of Catholic Indian Missions Records at Marquette University.

African-American Roman Catholicism
Native American Roman Catholics
Religious organizations established in 1874
Religious organizations established in 1884
Christian organizations established in 1907
Catholic organizations established in the 19th century
Catholic organizations established in the 20th century
History of Catholicism in the United States
1874 establishments in the United States